Anna Vasylivna Ryzhykova, nee Yaroshchuk (born 24 November 1989) is a Ukrainian track and field athlete who specialises in the 400 metres hurdles. At the European Athletics Championships, she won silver medals in 2012 and 2018, and bronze in 2022. Ryzhykova placed fifth at the 2020 Tokyo Olympics.

She won gold medals at the 2011 Summer Universiade and European U23 Championships. Ryzhykova is the Ukrainian record holder in her specialist event with a time of 52.96 seconds.

Career
Anna Yaroshchuk began her career in the sprinting events and represented Ukraine in the 200 metres at the Gymnasiade in 2006. In 2007, she ran a personal best of 24.58 seconds for the event and in a team with Hanna Titimets, Nataliya Pohrebnyak and Yelizaveta Bryzhina she set a national junior record in the 4×100 metres relay to take the silver medal at the 2007 European Athletics Junior Championships. She switched to the 400 m hurdles a year later and the move proved beneficial, as she won the national junior title and placed sixth in the event at the 2008 World Junior Championships in Athletics. She also helped the Ukrainian 4×400 metres relay team to win the silver medal behind the United States in national junior record time.

She was eighth in the hurdles at the 2009 European Athletics U23 Championships and Ukraine came fourth in the relay. Yaroshchuk won her first senior national title in the hurdles that year and improved her personal best time to 57.23 seconds. Further personal bests came at the 2010 Ukrainian championships, as she was runner-up in the 200 m and 400 m hurdles with times of 23.49 seconds and 55.60 seconds respectively. She gained selection for the 2010 European Athletics Championships, but was eliminated in the semi-final of the competition.

Yaroshchuk ran a personal best of 54.77 seconds to win the hurdles gold at the 2011 European Athletics U23 Championships ahead of compatriot Hanna Titimets and the two later combined their efforts to claim the silver in the 4 x 400m relay behind Russia. She won her second 400 m hurdles gold of the season at the Summer Universiade. 

She placed third at the 2012 European Championships, clocking 54.35 seconds. The 2012 London Olympics were unsuccessful for her, as she went out of the hurdles event in the second semi-final in 55.51, but won a bronze medal as part of women's 4 x 400m relay after the Russian team was disqualified for the second time in 2017.

In 2018, Ryzhykova took a silver medal in her specialist event at the European Championships with a time of 54.51 seconds, behind only Switzerland's Léa Sprunger who ran 54.33. Meghan Beesley of Great Britain in third was almost one second slower.

She placed seventh at the 2019 World Championships in a time of 54.45 seconds (equal with a mark of USA's Ashley Spencer in sixth).

She then improved her position at the 2020 Tokyo Olympics by placing fifth in the final with a 53.48 seconds performance. Her compatriot Viktoriya Tkachuk came sixth in 53.79.

Competition record

References

External links

Living people
Sportspeople from Dnipro
1989 births
Ukrainian female sprinters
Ukrainian female hurdlers
Athletes (track and field) at the 2012 Summer Olympics
Olympic athletes of Ukraine
European Athletics Championships medalists
World Athletics Championships athletes for Ukraine
Universiade medalists in athletics (track and field)
Universiade gold medalists for Ukraine
Universiade silver medalists for Ukraine
Athletes (track and field) at the 2019 European Games
European Games medalists in athletics
European Games gold medalists for Ukraine
Ukrainian Athletics Championships winners
Medalists at the 2011 Summer Universiade
Medalists at the 2013 Summer Universiade
Athletes (track and field) at the 2020 Summer Olympics
Olympic bronze medalists for Ukraine
Medalists at the 2012 Summer Olympics
Olympic bronze medalists in athletics (track and field)
21st-century Ukrainian women